The city government of Atlanta, Georgia, in the United States is composed of a mayor and body of one councilman from each of 12 districts, a City Council President, and 3 other at-large councilmen:

Post 1 representing districts 1-4
Post 2 representing districts 5-8
Post 3 representing districts 9-12

The entire slate is elected for four-year terms in off-year elections (2001, 2005, 2009, etc.).

History
In 1954, Atlanta’s ward system was changed from a bicameral body of councilmen representing Wards and three citywide (at-large) aldermen to a system of six citywide aldermen with a Vice-Mayor who served as the president of the Board of Aldermen. This eliminated the strength of the wards.

In 1973 a new charter was passed which shifted the city to a district system and took effect at the start of 1974.
The chief architect of that charter was Grace Towns Hamilton with the purpose  to more equitably represent the changing racial composure of the city and coincided with the city's first Black mayor, Maynard Jackson, taking office.

In this reformulation, the Vice-Mayor (and Board of Aldermen president) was changed to the President of the City Council (elected citywide) and 12 districts were drawn represented by one  Council member each; in addition there were 6 at-large posts giving a 19-member body.
In 1996, the current makeup was enacted which reduced the number of Council members to 16 by reducing the number of at-large posts from six to three.

See also
 Government of Georgia (U.S. state)
 Invest Atlanta (formerly Atlanta Development Authority)
Atlanta Housing Authority

References
Stone, Clarence N., Regime Politics Governing Atlanta: 1946-1988, 1989, University Press of Kansas
Lamar Willis's history

External links
 

 
Atlanta